The 1975 African Cup Winners' Cup was the first edition of the African Cup Winners' Cup. The tournament was won by Tonnerre Yaoundé of Cameroon, who beat Stella Club d'Adjamé of Ivory Coast 5-1 on aggregate in the final.

First round

|}

Notes
 One team received a bye: Fortior Mahajanga (Madagascar)

Quarterfinals

|}

Notes
1The match was abandoned in the second half with Tonnerre Yaoundé leading 3–0 after Al Ittihad players walked off to protest the officiating and the hostile home fans. Al Ittihad were ejected from the competition; after returning to Egypt, their players said that they were assaulted by local fans and police during the match after complaining about the poor officiating.

Semifinals

|}

Final

|}

Champion

References

External links
African Cup Winners' Cup results at Rec.Sport.Soccer Statistics Foundation

African Cup Winners' Cup
2